Litlabø is a village and former mining community in the municipality of Stord in Vestland county, Norway. It is located at the northern side of the lake of Storavatnet, just northeast of the village of Sagvåg.  The village had about 450 inhabitants as of 2001. Litlabø was the location for the pyrite mines of Stordø Kisgruber, which operated from 1907 to 1968.

References

Villages in Vestland
Mining communities in Norway
Stord